Lokomotyv  Stadium is a football-only stadium in Poltava, Ukraine, in Podil region of the city. It is currently used for football matches, and is the home of FC Poltava. The stadium's official maximum capacity is 2,500.

History 
Lokomotyv Stadium was built in Poltava in 1937. During the World War II the stadium was completely destroyed. The stadium was rebuilt in 1949.

Reconstruction  

In 2008 the stadium was completely renovated with new plastic seating for 2500 spectators and a commissioned VIP-platform for guests of honor. Reconstruction was financed by the club president Leonid Sobolev.

References

Football venues in Poltava Oblast
Sports venues in Poltava
FC Poltava
1937 establishments in Ukraine
Sports venues completed in 1937